The UCI Road World Championships - Women's under-23 road race is the annual world championship for road bicycle racing for women aged 23 or under, organised by the world governing body, the Union Cycliste Internationale. The event was first run in 2022.

Medal winners

Medallists by nation

References

 
Women's under-23 road race
Women's road bicycle races
Lists of UCI Road World Championships medalists
Under-23 cycle racing